Rugrats: I Gotta Go Party is a 2002 Game Boy Advance game based on the Rugrats series developed by Eurocom Entertainment Software and published by THQ. It was also released on a triple pack cartridge bundled with Tak and the Power of Juju and SpongeBob SquarePants: SuperSponge in 2005.

Gameplay
The game's storyline centers on Tommy Pickles playing a game of hide and seek with his brother, Dil, his cousin, Angelica Pickles, and his friends, Chuckie Finster, Phil and Lil DeVille, and Kimi Finster.

The player helps Tommy find the characters and unlock mini party games for each Rugrat. The player receives a cookie after getting a satisfactory score. The game takes one cookie away if the player does not obtain a satisfactory score. The mini games range from bouncing bones, catching cookies and slide puzzles. Upon winning, the player gets a ranking. The better the player performs, the better the ranking is, with the ultimate title being "Top Toddler."

Reception
Rugrats: I Gotta Go Party received generally positive feedback from critics upon release, with FamilyFriendlyGaming giving the game a 76% rating, GameZone providing an 8.6 out of 10 score, and GameVortex stating that although it's skewed to a primarily young audience, it's "good enough to please older fans of party games as well."

References

Klasky Csupo video games
2002 video games
Game Boy Advance games
Game Boy Advance-only games
Rugrats and All Grown Up! video games
Video games scored by Jake Kaufman
Video games developed in the United Kingdom
Eurocom games
THQ games
Action-adventure games
Party video games
Single-player video games